Madaras is a village in Bács-Kiskun county, Hungary.

Madaras may also refer to:

 Madaras (surname)
 Sherkat-e Madaras, a village in Kenarshahr Rural District, Iran

See also 
 Mădăraș (disambiguation)
 Madara (disambiguation)